Fuenteovejuna is a play by the Spanish playwright Lope de Vega. First published in Madrid in 1619, as part of Docena Parte de las Comedias de Lope de Vega Carpio (Volume 12 of the Collected plays of Lope de Vega Carpio), the play is believed to have been written between 1612 and 1614. The play is based upon a historical incident that took place in the village of Fuenteovejuna in Castile, in 1476. While under the command of the Order of Calatrava, a commander, Fernán Gómez de Guzmán, mistreated the villagers, who banded together and killed him. When a magistrate sent by King Ferdinand II of Aragon arrived at the village to investigate, the villagers, even under the pain of torture, responded only by saying "Fuenteovejuna did it."

Background
Rapid change took place in Spain in the years between the historical incident at Fuenteovejuna in 1476 to the writing of Lope's play in 1614. In that time, Spain united under the Habsburgs and become a world superpower with the discovery of the New World. At the time of Lope's writing, Spain was still in the midst of a Siglo de Oro ("Golden Century"), which saw growth in all fields of the arts and academics.

In 1469, seven years before the events at Fuenteovejuna, Princess Isabella I of Castile married Prince Ferdinand II of Aragon. With their marriage, the two major kingdoms of Spain—Castile and Aragon—were joined. This marriage would later ensure the successful completion of the Christian Reconquista of Spain from the Muslim Moors. When Isabella ascended the throne upon the death of her half-brother, Enrique IV, in 1474, Alfonso V of Portugal crossed into Spain in order to secure the throne for Juana, Princess of Castile, the daughter of Enrique. At the Battle of Toro, two years later, Isabella and Ferdinand's forces defeated the forces of Alfonso and Juana.

The same year, Ciudad Real was attacked by knights of the Order of Calatrava under the leadership of its Grand Master, 20-year-old Rodrigo Téllez Girón, who supported the claims to the throne by Alfonso and Juana. The city was of strategic importance due to its location near the border of Castile. It was during this invasion that Commander Gómez de Guzmán was killed by the villagers of Fuenteovejuna after he treated them poorly. After no single guilty party was found, Ferdinand pardoned the villagers from Fuenteovejuna.

Summary

The first act opens in Almagro at the home of the Grand Master of the Order of Calatrava, Rodrigo Téllez Girón. Here, a commander of the order, Fernán Gómez de Guzmán, urges his superior to seize the town of Ciudad Real in the name of Juana and Alfonso of Portugal. Girón decides to capture the city. The village and villagers of Fuenteovejuna are introduced and speak of love. The Commander enters and attempts to take two of the women, Laurencia and Pascuala, back to his castle, but they resist and escape. King Ferdinand and Queen Isabella discuss the capture of Ciudad Real and vow to retake it. Later, two young lovers, Laurencia and Frondoso, meet in the forest. When the Commander approaches, Frondoso hides and watches as the Commander attempts to force himself on Laurencia. As the Commander has put down his crossbow, Frondoso steps out and takes it. As Laurencia escapes his grasp, Frondoso points the crossbow at the Commander, leaving with only the crossbow as the Commander curses both of them.

Act II begins in the village with a discussion among the peasants that is interrupted by the entrance of the Commander. He demands Esteban, Laurencia's father, to allow him to have her but he refuses and the Commander takes this as an insult. A soldier enters and begs the Commander to return to Ciudad Real (Royal City) which has just been surrounded by the forces of Ferdinand and Isabella. After the exit of the Commander, Laurencia and Pascuala go on the run with one of the peasants, Mengo. They are met by another peasant girl, Jacinta, who is being pursued by the Commander's servants. When Mengo protects her, they are both seized by the Commander's lackeys who will whip Mengo while Jacinta is raped by the Commander and then given to his men. Shortly afterwards, Esteban agrees to allow Laurencia and Frondoso to marry. The wedding proceeds but is interrupted by the Commander who arrests Frondoso, for his threat with the crossbow, as well as Esteban and Laurencia who protest his arrest.

The third act opens with the men of the village meeting to decide how to handle the situation. Laurencia, having been beaten and subject to attempted Droit du seigneur (though she beats off her attackers and escapes) enters, but is not immediately recognized. She reprimands the men for not attempting to rescue her, inspiring the men to kill the Commander. While preparations are being made to hang Frondoso, the band of villagers enters and kills the Commander and one of his servants. Flores, the surviving servant, escapes and rushes to Ferdinand and Isabella to tell what has happened. The shocked rulers order a magistrate to the village to investigate. The villagers, celebrating with the head of the Commander, are told of the magistrate's approach. In order to save themselves, the villagers say "Fuenteovejuna did it". The magistrate proceeds to torture men, women, and young boys on the rack, but gives up after not receiving a satisfactory answer. Ferdinand and Isabella pardon the Grand Master and when the villagers enter and tell their story, they are pardoned as well.

Themes
Class struggle is one of the key concepts as there is a large gap between those in power and those without, namely farmers and peasants. The commander holes up the town with his power and wealth. Only as a collective are they able to fight back. Women's rights are another major theme, surprising as it may be for the time of this writing. The commander has taken the city as his personal harem. Once the attempted rape occurs with Laurencia, his downfall begins. It is Laurencia that encourages the town to rise against the Commander and the women that take the lives of officers. An additional theme as is tradition versus progress. Spain at the time was in the middle of much change per the backdrop of the play. The deaths of the Commander and Ortuno is not just murder but mutiny. While Ferdinand and Isabella decline to find the town guilty; they are not pleased to pardon them either despite the brutality.

Recent productions
The Soviet ballet Laurencia was based on Fuenteovejuna.

The play has been filmed several times in Spanish and other languages, but never in English. A musical version, called Fuente Ovehuna, was produced in 1972.

Fuenteovejuna was produced as a play in three acts, in English translation by William Colford, at La MaMa Experimental Theatre Club in 1972.

A musical version of the play was produced by the State Theatre of Northern Greece in 1976-77, with music by Thanos Mikroutsikos and lyrics by Yorgos Michaelides.

The play was produced at London's Royal National Theatre in 1989, as adapted by Adrian Mitchell and directed by Declan Donnellan.

Fuenteovejuna was produced at the Stratford Shakespeare Festival in 2008 (see Stratford Festival production history), with Scott Wentworth as the tyrant and Jonathan Goad and Sara Topham as the lovers. The Toronto Globe and Mail gave the production a favorable review.

The Village, directed by Nadia Fall at The Royal Stratford East is based on the Spanish play. It opens her inaugural season as Artistic Director of Stratford East. This contemporary work is set in India.

References

Further reading 
 Blue, William R. "The Politics of Lope’s Fuenteovejuna." Hispanic Review 59:3 (1991): 295-315.
 Cañadas, Ivan. "Class, Gender and Community in Thomas Dekker’s The Shoemaker’s Holiday and Lope de Vega’s Fuente Ovejuna." Parergon 19.2 (July 2002): 118-50.
 Cañadas, Ivan. The Public Theaters of Golden Age Spain and Tudor-Stuart England: Class, Gender and Festive Community. Aldershot, England, and Burlington, Vermont: Ashgate, 2005 (chapter 5). ; .
 Carter, Robin. "Fuente Ovejuna and Tyranny: Some Problems of Linking Drama with Political Theory", Forum for Modern Language Studies 13 (1977): 313-35.
 Darst, David H. "Las analogías funcionales en Fuenteovejuna", Neophilologus 79 (1995): 245-52.
Edwards, Gwynne, ed. and trans. Lope de Vega, Three Major Plays (with The Knight of Olmedo and Punishment without Revenge). Oxford University Press, 1999. .
 Fischer, Susan L. "Fuente Ovejuna on the Rack: Interrogation of a Carnivalesque Theatre of Terror", Hispanic Review 65:1 (1997): 61-92.
 Gerli, E. Michael. "The Hunt of Love: The Literalization of a Metaphor in Fuenteovejuna." Neophilologus 63 (1979): 54-58.
 Herrero, Javier. "The New Monarchy: A Structural Reinterpretation of Fuenteovejuna", RHM 36:4 (1970-1): 173-85.
Morley, S. Griswold and C. Bruerton. Cronologia de las Comedias de Lope de Vega. Madrid, 1968.
Answers Ltd. The Theme Of Love In Fuenteovejuna English Literature Essay. uk, November 2018

External links

 Fuenteovejuna study guide (in Spanish)
 BBC Radio 3 play. Adapted by Adrian Mitchell, broadcast August 5, 2007.
 2008 Stratford Shakespeare Festival production, version by Laurence Boswell.
Fuenteovejuna movie (in Spanish) 

Spanish plays
1619 plays
Plays by Lope de Vega
Spanish plays adapted into films